Mount Draeger is a mountain,  high, in the northwest part of the Posey Range, Bowers Mountains, Victoria Land, Antarctica. The mountain overlooks from the east the junction of Smithson Glacier with the Graveson Glacier. The topographical feature was first mapped by the United States Geological Survey from surveys and U.S. Navy air photos, 1960–62, and was named by the Advisory Committee on Antarctic Names for chief radioman Ernest J. Draeger, U.S. Navy, a member of the winter party at McMurdo Station, Hut Point Peninsula, Ross Island, in 1967. The mountain lies situated on the Pennell Coast, a portion of Antarctica lying between Cape Williams and Cape Adare.

References 

Mountains of Victoria Land
Pennell Coast